The Alabama Airborne are a professional American football team based in Mobile, Alabama. The team is member of the Major League Football (MLFB), a public traded professional football league, and plays its home games at Ladd–Peebles Stadium.

The Airborne are part of the league "Core Four" teams. They are the first pro football team in Mobile since the Regional Football League Mobile Admirals.

History
On March 18, 2022, MLFB launched a new website and revealed that there will be only four teams for the first season. The Airborne weren't part of the initial announcement, as the plan was to put a team in Texas (Texas Independence) but after the league couldn't secure a stadium deal on time, they changed their plans and relocated the team to Mobile, Alabama six weeks before the start of the training camp. The Airborne started their training camp on July 21. One week later, the team was evicted from its hotel amid unpaid bills and reports of the league shutting down.

Staff

Players

References

American football teams in Alabama
Sports in Mobile, Alabama
2022 establishments in Alabama